Victor Jack Maddern (16 March 1928 – 22 June 1993) was an English actor. He was described by The Telegraph as having "one of the most distinctive and eloquent faces in post-war British cinema."

Life and career
Born in Seven Kings, Ilford, Essex, Maddern attended Beal Grammar Boys school and afterwards joined the Merchant Navy at the age of 15 and served in the Second World War from 1943 until its end and was medically discharged in 1946.

He subsequently trained at the Royal Academy of Dramatic Art (RADA). He made his first screen appearance in Seven Days to Noon in 1950, playing a reluctant soldier obliged to shoot a psychotic scientist. One of his earliest stage roles was as Sam Weller in The Trial of Mr Pickwick (1952). Appearing as Helicon in a production of Albert Camus' play Caligula (1964), Maddern was singled out for critical praise, and in My Darling Daisy (1970) portrayed the notorious Frank Harris. He also did two stints in the highly successful Agatha Christie play The Mousetrap - the longest-running production in London's West End.

From 1950 to the early 1990s, Maddern appeared in films and TV series, often portraying military types, usually cast as sergeants or corporals, as well as privates, seaman or airmen, played either straight or comically, though one exception to this rule was when he portrayed a deformed hunchback, named Carl, in the horror film Blood of the Vampire (1958). He played minor roles in five Carry On films. Among his many TV roles were Private Gross in Denis Cannan's Captain Carvallo, old Lampwick's son-in-law in The Dick Emery Show., and Tommy Finch, the British dad in Fair Exchange in 1962–63 on CBS network, one of the first hour-long situation comedies. In 1963, he had a guest role on Perry Mason as jewel smuggler Gilbert Tyrell, in the episode "The Case of the Floating Stones."

Besides acting, Maddern ran a script printing business, and in 1991 opened a public speaking school. A lifelong Conservative Party voter, he offered special rates to Conservative MPs and constituency workers.

In his later years, Maddern devoted much of his time to charitable work. He was married with four daughters. He died from a brain tumour in Hackney, London, in 1993, aged 65.

Partial filmography

 Morning Departure (1950) – Leading Telegraphist Hillbrook
 Seven Days to Noon (1950) – Private Jackson
 The Franchise Affair (1951) – Mechanic
 Pool of London (1951) – First Tram Conductor (uncredited)
 I’ll Never Forget You (1951) – Geiger Man (uncredited)
 High Treason (1951) – Anarchist (uncredited)
 His Excellency (1952) – Soldier
 Angels One Five (1952) – Airman
 The Planter's Wife (1952) – Radio operator (uncredited)
 Top Secret (1952) – British N.C.O.
 Time Bomb (1953) – Saboteur
 Street of Shadows (1953) – Danny Thomas
 Sailor of the King (1953) – Signalman Willy 'Misery' Earnshaw
 Malta Story (1953) – Grouchy Soldier Clearing Rocks (uncredited)
 The Good Beginning (1953) – Bookie's Runner (uncredited)
 The Young Lovers (1954) – Sailor (uncredited)
 The Sea Shall Not Have Them (1954) – Gus Westover
 Carrington V.C. (1954) – Sergeant Owen
 Fabian of the Yard (1954)
 Raising a Riot (1955) – Guardsman (uncredited)
 The End of the Affair (1955) – 1st Orator
 The Night My Number Came Up (1955) – Engineer
 Footsteps in the Fog  (1955) – Jones
 Josephine and Men (1955) – Henry
 The Cockleshell Heroes (1955) – Sergeant Craig
 It's a Great Day (1955) – Charlie Mead
 Private's Progress (1956) – Pvt. George Blake
 The Last Man to Hang (1956) – Bonaker
 Child in the House (1956) – Bert
 A Hill in Korea (1956) – Pvt. Lindop
 The Man in the Sky, aka Decision Against Time (1957) – Joe Biggs
 Seven Waves Away (1957) – Willy Hawkins
 Saint Joan (1957) – English Soldier
 Face in the Night (1957) – Ted
 Strangers' Meeting (1957) – Willie Fisher
 Barnacle Bill (1957) – Figg
 Son of a Stranger (1957) – Lenny
 Carve Her Name with Pride (1958) – Sergeant, Parachute Training Instructor (uncredited)
 Happy Is the Bride (1958) – Shop Steward
 The Safecracker (1958) – Morris
 Dunkirk (1958) – Merchant Seaman in Pub
 Cat & Mouse (1958) – Superintendent Harding
 Blood of the Vampire (1958) – Carl
 I Was Monty's Double (1958) – Orderly Sergeant
 The Square Peg (1958) – Cpl Motor Pool. (uncredited)
 The Siege of Pinchgut (1959) – Bert
 I'm All Right Jack (1959) – Knowles
 Please Turn Over (1959) – Works Manager
 Sink the Bismarck! (1960) – Able Seaman (uncredited)
 Carry On Constable (1960) – Detective Sergeant Liddell
 Let's Get Married (1960) – Works Manager
 Light Up the Sky! (1960) – Lance Corporal Tomlinson
 Watch Your Stern (1960) – Sailor fishing for bike
 Crossroads to Crime (1960) – Len
 Exodus (1960) – Sergeant
 Carry On Regardless (1961) – First Sinister Passenger
 Raising the Wind (1961) – Removal Man
 On the Fiddle (1961) – First Airman
 Petticoat Pirates (1961) – CPO Nixon
 H.M.S. Defiant (1962) – Bosun Dawlish
 The Longest Day (1962) – Camp Cook (uncredited)
 Carry On Spying (1964) – Milchmann
 Carry On Cleo (1964) – Sergeant-Major
 Rotten to the Core (1965) – Anxious O'Toole
 Bunny Lake Is Missing (1965) – Taxi Driver
 Circus of Fear (1966) – Mason
 The Magnificent Two (1967) – Drunken Soldier
 Run Like a Thief (1967) – Abel Baker
 Cuckoo Patrol (1967) – Dicko
 The Lost Continent (1968) – The Mate
 Decline and Fall... of a Birdwatcher (1968) – First Warder
 Chitty Chitty Bang Bang (1968) – Junkman
 The Bushbaby (1969) – Barman
 The Magic Christian (1969) – Hot Dog Vendor
 Cromwell (1970) – Executioner (uncredited)
 The Magnificent Six and 1/2 (1971)
 Steptoe and Son (1972) – Chauffeur
 Digby, the Biggest Dog in the World (1973) – Dog Home Manager
 Carry On Emmannuelle (1978) – Man in Launderette
 Around the World in 80 Days (1989) – Liverpool Ticket Agent
 Freddie as F.R.O.7 (1992) – Old Gentleman Raven (voice) (final film role)

Selected television credits

 The Adventures of Robin Hood (1958) – Hugo
 Sir Francis Drake (1961-1962) – Brewer / Ship's Cook
 Fair Exchange (1962-1963) – Tommy Finch
 Perry Mason (1963) – Gilbert Tyrell
 Mess Mates (1960) – 'Tug' Nelson
 Bonanza (1963) – Dave
 Crossroads (1964) – Bert Henderson
 The Troubleshooters (1965) – Rogers
 Gideon's Way (1965) – Charles Randle
 Take a Pair of Private Eyes (1966) – Cokey Brock
 The Avengers (1966) – Jackson in Episode "The Thirteenth Hole" 
 The Prisoner (1967) – Bandmaster
 The Baron (1967) – Dino
 The Wednesday Play (1967) – Wagger
 The Saint (1967-1968) – Enrico Montesino
 Dixon of Dock Green (1967-1975) – Orrie Heppledene / Forbes / Jimmy Lester / Fred Hall
 The Ugliest Girl in Town (1968) – Freddie
 Doctor Who - (Fury from the Deep) (1968) – Robson
 Softly Softly (1970)
 Randall and Hopkirk (Deceased) (1970) – Detective Sergeant Watts
 The Dick Emery Show (1968-1980) – Ernie
 Paul Temple (1971) – Bill Stacey
 The Frighteners (4 August 1972, ITV (TV network)) - ('The Disappearing Man') - (Arthur)
 Crown Court (1973) – Joe Fisk
 1990 (1977) – Sammy Calhoun
 Together (1980) – Harry Klein
 In Loving Memory (1982) – Comic
 That's My Boy (1983) – Bluebird Johnny
 Miss Marple: The Moving Finger (1985) – Police Constable Johnson
 The Beiderbecke Tapes (1987) – Sam Bentley
 C.A.B. (1988) – Private Tripe
 The Bill (1990) – Mr Grant
 The Darling Buds of May (1992) – Fruity Pears

References

External links
 
 Victor Maddern Obituary in The Independent

1928 births
1993 deaths
20th-century English male actors
Alumni of RADA
British charity and campaign group workers
British Merchant Navy personnel
British Merchant Navy personnel of World War II
Deaths from brain cancer in England
English male film actors
English male stage actors
English male television actors
Male actors from Essex
People from Ilford